Canoeing and kayaking competitions at the 2021 Southeast Asian Games took place at Thủy Nguyên Boat Racing Center in Hải Phòng, Vietnam from 17 to 21 May 2022.

Medal table

Medalists

Men

Women

References

Canoeing